Nikos Linardos (born August 26, 1963, in Greece) is a retired Greek professional basketball player and coach. During his playing career, at a height of 2.03 m (6'8") tall, he played at the power forward position.

Club playing career
Linardos played club basketball with the Greek League team Panionios. He was a member of the Panionios team that finished in 2nd place in the Greek League in 1987 (the club's highest ever finish in the league), and he was also a member of the Panionios team that won the 1991 Greek Cup (the only title in the club's history). He also played with the Greek clubs Sporting, Panellinios, and Maroussi.

National team playing career
Linardos was a member of the senior men's Greek national team that won the gold medal at the 1987 EuroBasket.

Post-playing career
Linardos worked as an assistance coach under head coaches like Dean Smith at North Carolina (1997–98) and Mike Krzyzewski at Duke (1998–99). He was also an assistant coach under Vangelis Alexandris at Maroussi, and under Panagiotis Giannakis, in the senior men's Greek national team (2007–08).

He also worked as the head coach of Maroussi and APOEL. With APOEL, he won the Cypriot Cup title in 2003. After that, he worked as the head coach of Apollon Limassol, and Panionios. 

In 2013, he began to coach a youth academy basketball team in Galatsi, Athens, along with his former teammate Michalis Romanidis. In July 2018, he became the Director of the basketball academies of Panionios GSS. Linardos has also worked as a sports commentator, doing analysis during broadcasts of basketball games on Greek TV.

Personal life
Linardos' father, Petros(1925–2022), was a journalist and author. His grandparents were refugees from Smyrna

References

External links
FIBA Profile
FIBA Europe Profile
Hellenic Basketball Federation Profile 
KBA Coach Profile

1963 births
Living people
FIBA EuroBasket-winning players
Greek basketball coaches
Greek men's basketball players
Maroussi B.C. coaches
Maroussi B.C. players
Panionios B.C. coaches
Panionios B.C. players
Panellinios B.C. players
Power forwards (basketball)
Sporting basketball players